Lenyeletse Mpetwane Seretse (25 June 19213 January 1983) was the second Vice-President of Botswana from July 1980 until his death on 3 January 1983. From Serowe, Northern Botswana, Seretse was appointed Vice-President to placate his fellow Northerners following the assumption of Southerner Quett Masire to the Presidency.

In 1937, Lenyeletse was sent to undertake Secondary School studies alongside Seretse Khama at Tiger Kloof. Upon graduation in1944, Lenyeletse and Seretse were inducted into the Malekantwa age regiment.

References

Vice-presidents of Botswana
1921 births
1983 deaths
Botswana Democratic Party politicians
Agriculture ministers of Botswana